Literature and Medicine is an academic journal founded in 1982. It is devoted to researching and understanding the interfaces between literary and medical knowledge. Literary and cultural texts are used to examine concerns related to illness, trauma, the body, and other medical issues. Articles are provided by experts in a variety of fields in both medicine and the humanities and social sciences. There are two issues each year, one general, one thematic.

The journal is published biannually in May and November by the Johns Hopkins University Press. Circulation is 497 and the average length of an issue is 164 pages.

See also
Medical humanities

External links
Official website
 Literature and Medicine  at Project MUSE

Literary magazines published in the United States
Publications established in 1982
General medical journals
Biannual journals
English-language journals
Johns Hopkins University Press academic journals
1982 establishments in Maryland